Dinner at Eight is an opera by William Bolcom to a libretto by Mark Campbell based on the play of the same name by George S. Kaufman. It was first performed at the Minnesota Opera on 11 March 2017 in a production staged by Tomer Zvulun. The same production received its European premiere in October of 2018 in the Wexford Festival in Ireland.

References

2017 operas
Operas based on plays
Operas set in the United States
Operas set during the Great Depression
Operas by William Bolcom
English-language operas
Operas
Adaptations of works by Edna Ferber

External links
 Dinner At Eight: A New Opera In Minnesota, Part One | Live Design Online
 Dinner At Eight: A New Opera In Minnesota, Part Two | Live Design Online